Homolophus is a genus of harvestmen in the family Phalangiidae.

Species
 Homolophus afghanum (Roewer, 1956)
 Homolophus albofasciatum (Kulczynski, 1901)
 Homolophus altaicum Roewer, 1923
 Homolophus arcticus Banks, 1893
 Homolophus betpakdalense (Gritzenko, 1976)
 Homolophus chitralense (Roewer, 1956)
 Homolophus coreanum (Roewer, 1927b)
 Homolophus funestus L.Koch, 1877
 Homolophus gobiensis Tsurusaki, Tchemeris & Logunov, 2000
 Homolophus lindbergi (Roewer, 1960)
 Homolophus luteum Suzuki, 1966
 Homolophus martensi (W. Starega, 1986)
 Homolophus nepalicus (Roewer, 1912)
 Homolophus pallens (Kulczynski, 1901)
 Homolophus panpema Suzuki, 1966
 Homolophus punctatus Banks, 1894
 Homolophus rishiri N. Tsurusaki, 1987
 Homolophus suzukii Silhvay, 1972
 Homolophus thienshanense (Silhavý, 1967)
 Homolophus tibetanus (Roewer, 1911)
 Homolophus transbaicalicum (Kulczynski, 1901)
 Homolophus trinkleri (Roewer, 1956)
 Homolophus turcicum (Roewer, 1959)
 Homolophus vernale Starega, 1979
 Homolophus vladimirae (Silhavý, 1967)

References

Harvestmen
Taxa named by Nathan Banks
Harvestman genera